The 1964 European Cup Winners' Cup Final was a football match contested between Sporting CP of Portugal and MTK Budapest of Hungary. The fourth European Cup Winners' Cup final, the match was played at Heysel Stadium, Brussels, ending in a 3–3 tie and the therefore necessary replay two days later in Bosuil Stadium, Antwerp. Sporting won the replay 1–0, with a famous direct corner kick goal by João Morais.

Route to the final

Match

Details

Replay

See also
MTK Budapest FC in European football
Sporting CP in European football

External links 
 UEFA Cup Winners' Cup results at Rec.Sport.Soccer Statistics Foundation
 1964 European Cup Winners' Cup Final at UEFA.com
 Match report
 cantinho do morais, (video of match winning goal of José Morais), YouTube, 2006.

Europa
Cup Winners' Cup Final 1964
Cup Winners' Cup Final 1964
International club association football competitions hosted by Belgium
UEFA Cup Winners' Cup Finals
Euro
Euro
Euro
 13-15
1960s in Antwerp
1960s in Brussels
Sports competitions in Antwerp
Sports competitions in Brussels